A tripeptide is a peptide derived from three amino acids joined by two or sometimes three peptide bonds. As for proteins, the function of peptides is determined by the constituent amino acids and their sequence. The simplest tripeptide is glycine. In terms of scientific investigations, the dominant tripeptide is glutathione (γ-L-Glutamyl-L-cysteinylglycine), which serves many roles in many forms of life.

Examples
Eisenin (pGlu-Gln-Ala-OH) is a peptide with immunological activity that is isolated from the Japanese marine alga, Eisenia bicyclis, which more commonly is known as Arame
GHK-Cu (glycyl-L-histidyl-L-lysine) is a human copper binding peptide with wound healing and skin remodeling activity, which is used in anti-aging cosmetics and more commonly referred to as copper peptide
Lactotripeptides (Ile-Pro-Pro and Val-Pro-Pro) found in milk products, act as ACE inhibitors
Leupeptin (N-acetyl-L-leucyl-L-leucyl-L-argininal) is a protease inhibitor that also acts as an inhibitor of calpain
Melanostatin (prolyl-leucyl-glycinamide) is a peptide hormone produced in the hypothalamus that inhibits the release of melanocyte-stimulating hormone (MSH)
Ophthalmic acid (L-γ-glutamyl-L-α-aminobutyryl-glycine) is an analogue of glutathione isolated from crystalline lens
Norophthalmic acid (y-glutamyl-alanyl-glycine) is an analogue of glutathione (L-cysteine replaced by L-alanine) isolated from crystalline lens
Thyrotropin-releasing hormone (TRH, thyroliberin or protirelin) (L-pyroglutamyl-L-histidinyl-L-prolinamide) is a peptide hormone that stimulates the release of thyroid-stimulating hormone and prolactin by the anterior pituitary
ACV (δ-(L-α-aminoadipyl)-L-Cys-D-Val) is a key biosynthetic precursor to penicillin and cephalosporin.

See also
Dipeptide
Tetrapeptide

References

Peptides
Tripeptides